Ițcani is a neighbourhood of Suceava, the county seat town of Suceava County in the historical region of Bukovina, northeastern Romania, located some 5 km northwest of the town center. Ițcani was initially established in the 15th century, following a 1453 document issued by Alexăndrel, Domn (i.e. Prince) of Moldavia. 

Along with the rest of Bukovina, it became part of the Habsburg monarchy during the late 18th century and then, gradually, of the Austrian Empire and Austria-Hungary (pertaining to Cisleithania or the Austrian-ruled realms of the former Central European dual monarchy). During the 1780s, 8 ethnic German families settled here in the course of the Josephine colonization. 

After the unification of Bukovina with the Kingdom of Romania in 1918, Ițcani was subsequently recorded on official population censuses by the Romanian authorities as a commune composed of two separate villages, more specifically Ițcanii Noi and Ițcani Gară.

Furthermore, according to the Romanian 1930 census, as much as 45% of the commune's population was composed of ethnic Germans (i.e. Bukovina Germans), many of whom were later forcefully re-settled in occupied Poland during World War II as part of the Heim ins Reich policy plan initiated by Hitler's national socialists. Suceava North railway station is located in Ițcani.

Demographics 

The 1930 Romanian census recorded a relative majority for the ethnic Germans (more specifically the Bukovina Germans) living in Ițcani at that time, more specifically 45%, a percentage which overshadowed the other ethnic groups, among which, most notably, were the native Romanians. The latter only accounted for 21.4% of the total population. Other ethnic groups recorded then in the 1930 Romanian census were also the Jews, Ukrainians, Poles, Lipovans, and Hungarians.

During and after the end of World War II, many Bukovina Germans from Ițcani (as with the rest of Germans from Bukovina) were forcefully re-settled by the national socialists in then occupied Poland. Some of then returned, but the vast majority left permanently. Immigration of the Bukovina German community of Ițcani continued to West Germany in communist times as well.

Cultural heritage of the Bukovina German community in Ițcani 

Even to this day, after the vast majority of the ethnic Germans from Ițcani were deported to Nazi-occupied Poland, the cultural heritage of this community endured throughout the decades following the end of World War II through the local architecture of some of the houses belonging to them and also through the local churches of former Evangelical Lutheran and Roman Catholic confession.

Recent developments and recent history 

The neighbourhood's recent history is marked by depopulation and a relative stagnation in economic regards. However, there is potential for further economic development in the future. The vast majority of the Bukovina Germans either left long ago for West Germany (some of them returning) or passed away. Overall, Ițcani remains a poor neighbourhood of Suceava to this day. Nevertheless, it is very ethnically homogenous nowadays, with a strong Romanian majority accounting for much of its population.

Gallery

References 

Neighbourhoods in Romania
Suceava